The Hindu scriptures contain many numerical descriptions concerning distances, durations and numbers of items in the universe as seen from the perspective of Hindu cosmology.

List

Note: Where distances are given in yojana a rough equivalent is sometimes given in miles calculated at 8 miles to the yojana. The actual length of the yojana varied throughout its period of use between 4 and 9 miles.

See also
 Indian units of measurement
 Hindu units of time
 Kalpa (aeon)
 Manvantara
 Yuga
 Yuga Cycle

References

External links
 For distances in yojanas see the yojana page on vedabase.net.

Vedas